Ludvigs Bolšteins (February 5, 1888 – June 21, 1940) was a Latvian general. From 1925 to 1928 Bolšteins was commander of the Aizsargi home guard, from 1928 to 1940 commander of the Latvian border guard. He committed suicide following the Soviet occupation of Latvia.

Biography 

Ludvigs Bolšteins was born on February 5, 1888, in Sesavas parish. In 1907 Bolšteins graduated from St. Petersburg University, where he studied in the physics-mathematics faculty. In 1912 he joined the Russian army, and was decommissioned at the end of 1913.

When the World War I broke out, he was mobilised and initially he served in Daugavgrīvas fortress, later assisting in the formation of Latvian riflemen battalions. He served in the 1st Daugavgrīvas Latvian riflemen battalion, where he started his service as praporshchik, but by the end of his service in the Russian army he had risen to the rank of stabskapitan. During World War I was awarded Order of St. Stanislaus (III class (with lances)) and Order of St. Anna (III and IV (with lances) classes).

After the Bolshevik rise to power, he was arrested in Cēsis, but managed to escape. Subsequently he travelled to Moscow, where he along with those who refused to join the Red Army, like his former commander Frīdrihs Briedis, took part in Savinkov's anti-Bolshevik organisation.

After the collapse of this organisation Bolšteins returned to Latvia on December 28, 1918. There he joined Latvian army. Initially he aided the formation of new units in Liepāja, and would later also serve at the front lines as a member of Kalpaks battalion. On July 12, 1919 Bolšteins obtained the rank of lieutenant colonel. On August 9 he was appointed the commander of the 9th Rēzeknes Infantry Regiment. After the liberation of Rīga he was made a colonel. For the remnant of the Latvian War of Independence he served on the Latgale front.

After being demobilized on September 15, 1920, Bolšteins took to farming at his estate in Līvbērze parish.  In 1925 he became the head of the Aizsargi home guard, and in 1928 became the commander of the Latvian Border guards. In 1935 he received the rank of general. During his service in the Latvian army he was awarded the Order of Lāčplēsis (II, III classes), Order of the Three Stars (II, III classes) and other Latvian and foreign decorations. After the occupation of Latvia by the USSR, he committed suicide in his office. Ludvigs Bolšteins was buried at the Brothers' Cemetery.

Before taking his life, Bolšteins left a suicide note directed to his superiors. In his letter he wrote:

See also 
 List of Latvian Army generals

References 

1888 births
1940 deaths
People from Jelgava Municipality
People from Courland Governorate
Latvian generals
Latvian Riflemen
Russian military personnel of World War I
Latvian military personnel of the Latvian War of Independence
Recipients of the Order of Lāčplēsis, 2nd class
Recipients of the Order of Lāčplēsis, 3rd class
Commanders of the Order of Polonia Restituta
Commander's Grand Crosses of the Order of the Lithuanian Grand Duke Gediminas
Recipients of the Legion of Honour
Military personnel who committed suicide